Seyyedan (also Romanized as Seyyedān and Sīdān; also known as Sedūn) is a village in Emamzadeh Abdol Aziz Rural District, Jolgeh District, Isfahan County, Isfahan Province, Iran. At the 2006 census, its population was 202, in 53 families.

References 

Populated places in Isfahan County